Slipping Wives is a silent comedy short film starring Priscilla Dean, Stan Laurel and Oliver Hardy prior to their official billing as the duo Laurel and Hardy. The team appeared in a total of 107 films between 1921 and 1951. Priscilla Dean was a popular silent film star.

Plot 
Priscilla is married to an artist called Leon. However Leon isn't showing much interest in his wife so she hatches a plot to win back his affections. Ollie plays the butler. Stan arrives at the door to sell paint and has a fight with Ollie. Priscilla employs Stan to "Make love to her" and ensure Leon becomes jealous. Ollie has to wash and dress Stan and make him look presentable enough to fool Leon at a dinner party that night. Priscilla admits to Leon what she has done and he pulls a gun to teach the 'home-wrecker' a lesson. Leon corners Stan and admits he's just acting to make Priscilla think he's really jealous. Ollie doesn't realise this and he chases Stan out of the house with a rifle. Ollie returns looking shaken. A police officer follows him and says "You nearly blew my brains out". Leon and Priscilla hug.

Partial remake
Slipping Wives was later reworked into the team's penultimate short film The Fixer Uppers, made in 1935.

Cast 
 Priscilla Dean as Wife
 Oliver Hardy as Butler
 Stan Laurel as Ferdinand Flamingo
 Herbert Rawlinson as Husband
 Albert Conti as Hon. Winchester Squirtz

External links 

 

1927 films
1927 comedy films
American silent short films
American black-and-white films
Films directed by Fred Guiol
Laurel and Hardy (film series)
Films with screenplays by H. M. Walker
1927 short films
American comedy short films
1920s English-language films
1920s American films
Silent American comedy films